The canton of Pontarlier is an administrative division of the Doubs department, eastern France. Its borders were modified at the French canton reorganisation which came into effect in March 2015. Its seat is in Pontarlier.

It consists of the following communes:
 
Chaffois
La Cluse-et-Mijoux
Dommartin
Doubs
Granges-Narboz
Houtaud
Pontarlier
Sainte-Colombe
Verrières-de-Joux
Vuillecin

References

Cantons of Doubs